Mumbo jumbo, or mumbo-jumbo, is confusing or meaningless language. The phrase is often used to express humorous criticism of middle-management, and specialty jargon, such as legalese, that non-specialists have difficulty in understanding. For example, "I don't understand all that legal mumbo jumbo in the fine print."

It may also refer to practices based on superstition, rituals intended to cause confusion, or languages that the speaker does not understand.



Origins

Mumbo Jumbo is a West African word often cited by historians and etymologists as deriving from the Mandinka word "Maamajomboo", which refers to a masked male dancer who takes part in religious ceremonies. In the 18th century Mumbo Jumbo referred to a West African god. Mungo Park's travel journal Travels in the Interior of Africa (1795) describes 'Mumbo Jumbo' as a character, complete with "masquerade habit", whom Mandinka males would dress up as in order to resolve domestic disputes. 

According to the Concise Oxford English Dictionary:

According to the 1803 Supplement to Encyclopædia Britannica Third Edition:

Usage
The phrase appears in Charles Dickens' Little Dorrit, originally published in serial form between 1855 and 1857. "He never dreamed of disputing their pretensions, but did homage to the miserable Mumbo jumbo they paraded."

It also appears in Thomas Hardy's A Pair of Blue Eyes published in 1873. 'A cracked edifice was a species of Mumbo Jumbo'.

First published in 1899, The Story of Little Black Sambo has a titular protagonist whose parents are named "Black Mumbo" and "Black Jumbo".

In 1972, Ishmael Reed wrote a postmodern novel titled Mumbo Jumbo which addresses a wide array of influences on African diaspora and culture, including historical realities like the Scramble for Africa and the Atlantic slave trade as well as its invented influences like the "Jes Grew" virus. The novel includes an etymology taken from the first edition of the American Heritage Dictionary that derives the phrase Mumbo Jumbo from the Mandingo mā-mā-gyo-mbō, meaning a "magician who makes the troubled spirits of ancestors go away."
 While the novel quotes this dictionary entry and includes a lengthy bibliography, the work is largely fictional and regularly blurs the line between fact and fiction. The title can also be interpreted to refer to the notion that postmodern works like Mumbo Jumbo are often dismissed as nonsensical.

The Story of an African Farm, an 1883 novel by Olive Schreiner, refers to half of a "Mumboo-jumbow idol [that] leaves us utterly in the dark as to what the rest was like." Its reference symbolizes the confusion and lack of descriptiveness that came from such an idol.

In his preface to Frantz Fanon's The Wretched of the Earth, Jean-Paul Sartre uses the phrase when speaking of revolutionary violence being diverted into native African religion: "Mumbo-Jumbo and all the idols of the tribe come down among them, rule over their violence and waste it in trances until it is exhausted".

In Vachel Lindsay's poem The Congo, Mumbo Jumbo is used as a metaphor for the pagan religion followed by the Africans he encounters. The poem, at the end of each of three sections, repeats the phrase "Mumbo Jumbo will hoodoo you".

In Stranger In A Strange Land by Robert Heinlein, the character Jubal speaks of Mumbo Jumbo as the "God of the Congo" towards the end of the novel in a discourse on the meaning of religions.

In Roots by Alex Haley, the Mumbo Jumbo is also mentioned in the context of tribal men disciplining disobedient wives.

In the 1928 novel The Twelve Chairs, when describing the limited vocabulary of one character, it is stated that "The lexicon of a Negro from the cannibalistic tribe Mumbo-Jumbo comprises three hundred words."

See also
Ajam
Gibberish
Jargon
Mambo (Vodou)
Simlish
Superstition

References

English phrases